The 2006–07 Boston Celtics season was the 61st season of the Boston Celtics in the National Basketball Association (NBA). The Celtics finished 24–58, the second-worst in franchise history after the 15–67 record in 1996–97. It was also the second-worst record in the league in 2006–07, only marginally in front of the Memphis Grizzlies. The season was overshadowed by many injuries, in particular the injury to All-Star Paul Pierce, which caused him to miss seven weeks, and the deaths of Celtic legends Red Auerbach and Dennis Johnson.

Key dates
June 28: The 2006 NBA Draft took place in New York City, New York.
July 1: The free agency period started.
October 10: The pre-season started with a win against the Cleveland Cavaliers.
October 28: Red Auerbach died at the age of 89 due to a heart attack.
November 1: The regular season started with a loss to the New Orleans/Oklahoma City Hornets.
December 20: Paul Pierce was injured in a loss to the Golden State Warriors.
January 10: Tony Allen was injured in a loss to the Indiana Pacers, which caused him to miss the rest of the season.
February 9: Paul Pierce returned from his injury in a loss to the New Jersey Nets.
February 14: The Celtics ended a franchise record 18-game losing streak with a win against the Milwaukee Bucks.
February 22: Dennis Johnson died at the age of 52 due to a heart attack.
April 18: The season concluded with a loss to the Detroit Pistons.

Summary
Just days before the start of the season, the Celtics were dealt an emotional blow when their patriarch Red Auerbach died at the age of 89. When the season started, the days of Auerbach seemed like a distant memory as the Celtics lost six of their first seven games en route to a 5–13 start. In December, the Celtics improved their play as they embarked on a 5-game winning streak. However, after losing All-Star Paul Pierce to a stress reaction in his left foot on December 20, the Celtics crumbled, winning just 3 of their next 42 games, including a franchise record 18-game losing streak that lasted from January 5 to February 14, and plunging into last place. In between the losing streak, the Celtics lost Tony Allen for the remainder of the season, who tore both the ACL and MCL on an uncontested dunk attempt on January 10.

Adding to the pain was the death of another Celtics legend, Dennis Johnson, who suffered a heart attack on February 22 at the age of 52 while coaching the Celtics NBDL affiliate, the Austin Toros. After Pierce had returned in early February after spending 7 weeks on the injured list, the Celtics played better and won 5 of 6 games in late February and early March. A few weeks later on St. Patrick's Day, the Celtics stunned the eventual NBA champions San Antonio Spurs 91-85 on the road, making it the first time the Celtics won against Tim Duncan, whom they missed out on during the 1997 Draft Lottery.

But nagging injuries would continue to hamper Pierce, who sat out all of April, as the Celtics finished with a horrible 24-58 record that earned them the worst record in the Eastern Conference and 2nd worst record in the league, only marginally in front of the Memphis Grizzlies. Afterwards, the Celtics turned their focus to the draft lottery, where they had good chances of landing a Top 2 pick, allowing them to select either Greg Oden or Kevin Durant. However, even the draft lottery came out all wrong for the Celtics as they were assigned the 5th overall selection, which seemed to guarantee another disappointing season.

Draft picks

Roster

Regular season

Standings

Record vs. opponents

Game log

Player statistics

Regular season

|-
| 
| 33 || 18 || 24.4 || style=";"| .514 || .242 || .784 || 3.8 || 1.7 || 1.5 || .4 || 11.5
|-
| 
| 73 || style=";"| 60 || 31.2 || .467 || .381 || .811 || 5.6 || 1.6 || .7 || .2 || 12.1
|-
| 
| style=";"| 81 || 26 || 22.0 || .419 || .368 || .805 || 2.6 || 1.0 || .5 || .3 || 10.4
|-
| 
| 69 || style=";"| 60 || 33.6 || style=";"| .514 || .000 || .681 || style=";"| 11.0 || 1.3 || .7 || style=";"| 1.5 || 16.0
|-
| 
| 24 || 0 || 9.8 || .413 || . || .667 || 2.0 || .2 || .3 || .5 || 1.7
|-
| 
| 72 || 53 || 21.9 || .491 || .000 || .600 || 5.2 || 1.3 || .3 || 1.3 || 4.5
|-
| 
| 47 || 46 || style=";"| 37.0 || .439 || .389 || .796 || 5.9 || 4.1 || 1.0 || .3 || style=";"| 25.0
|-
| 
| 6 || 0 || 16.7 || .444 || style=";"| .500 || .667 || 2.5 || .8 || .5 || .5 || 5.2
|-
| 
| 63 || 2 || 11.4 || .446 || .000 || .736 || 3.4 || .2 || .2 || .3 || 4.2
|-
| 
| 2 || 2 || 22.0 || .333 || . || .750 || 3.5 || .0 || .5 || style=";"| 1.5 || 2.5
|-
| 
| 47 || 5 || 15.1 || .386 || .414 || .764 || 1.5 || .9 || .4 || .1 || 6.2
|-
| 
| 78 || 25 || 23.5 || .418 || .207 || .647 || 3.7 || 3.8 || style=";"| 1.6 || .1 || 6.4
|-
| 
| 54 || 17 || 19.0 || .403 || .400 || .783 || 1.9 || 1.1 || .4 || .3 || 4.0
|-
| 
| 32 || 19 || 28.1 || .415 || .415 || style=";"| .897 || 3.1 || 1.7 || .6 || .1 || 15.0
|-
| 
| 78 || 30 || 20.2 || .371 || .289 || .818 || 1.4 || 2.8 || .6 || .1 || 6.1
|-
| 
| 69 || 47 || 32.2 || .427 || .365 || .853 || 3.0 || style=";"| 4.4 || 1.1 || .5 || 12.2
|}

Transactions

Trades

Free agents

Additions

Subtractions

See also
2006–07 NBA season

References

External links
2006–07 Boston Celtics season at Basketball Reference

Boston Celtics seasons
Boston Celtics
Boston Celtics
Boston Celtics
Celtics
Celtics